Dorival Silvestre Júnior (born 25 April 1962) is a Brazilian professional football coach and former player who played as a defensive midfielder.

Playing career
Known only as Júnior during his playing days, he was born in Araraquara, São Paulo, and made his debuts as a senior with hometown's Ferroviária in 1982. Two years later, after a brief stint at Marília, he moved to Guarani.

In 1985, Júnior began playing in the state of Santa Catarina, first for Avaí and later for Joinville. In 1988, he went back to his native state, representing São José, but during the same year he moved to Coritiba.

In 1989 Júnior joined Palmeiras, remaining with the club until 1992. In the following year he was sold to Grêmio, and subsequently joined Juventude in 1994.

Júnior had subsequent spells at Araçatuba, Matonense and Botafogo-SP, retiring with the latter in 1999, aged 37.

Coaching career
Júnior started his coaching career in 2002 with his first club Ferroviária, after being an assistant coach at Figueirense. He left the club in May of that year to return to Figueirense, as a director of football, but was named head coach of Figueira in September 2003 and won the Campeonato Catarinense in the following year. In 2005, he was appointed Fortaleza head coach, but was dismissed on 30 March.

In the same year, Júnior managed Criciúma and Juventude. In 2006, he won the Campeonato Pernambucano with Sport Recife and also managed Avaí in the same year before leaving the club in October to take over São Caetano.

On 8 May 2007, after impressing with the Azulão during that year's Campeonato Paulista, Júnior was named Cruzeiro head coach. On 3 December, despite finishing fifth, he was fired and subsequently joined Coritiba. After not renewing contract with the latter, he was appointed at the helm of Vasco da Gama, and was promoted from 2009 Série B.

On 5 December 2009, Júnior was named head coach of Santos. After notably winning the 2010 Campeonato Paulista with an extremely offensive football, with Neymar, Paulo Henrique Ganso and Robinho as its key units, he was dismissed on 21 September, after an altercation with Neymar.

Júnior subsequently managed Atlético Mineiro, Internacional, Flamengo, Vasco da Gama, Fluminense and Palmeiras, without the same success. On 9 July 2015 he returned to Santos, replacing Marcelo Fernandes.

Júnior finished second in both 2015 Copa do Brasil and 2016 Campeonato Brasileiro Série A, aside from winning the 2016 Campeonato Paulista. On 4 June 2017, after a 1–0 away defeat to rivals Corinthians and with the club in a poor form overall (only three points out of twelve), he was sacked.

On 5 July 2017, Júnior took over São Paulo, signing a contract until the end of 2018. He was sacked the following 9 March.

Júnior returned to Flamengo on 28 September 2018, being in charge until the end of the season. On 27 December of the following year, he was appointed head coach of fellow top tier side Athletico Paranaense.

On 28 August 2020, Júnior was dismissed by Athletico after the club suffered four consecutive defeats, despite him being sidelined in three of those defeats after testing positive for COVID-19. On 28 March 2022, after more than one year without coaching, he took over Ceará also in the top tier.

On 10 June 2022, Júnior left Ceará to return to Flamengo, replacing sacked Paulo Sousa. He led the side to the Copa do Brasil and Copa Libertadores titles, but left on 25 November, after not renewing his contract.

Personal life
Júnior is the nephew of the former Brazilian player Dudu. His son, Lucas Silvestre, is also his assistant since 2010.

In September 2019, Júnior was diagnosed with prostate cancer, which he removed in the following month.

Career statistics

Coaching statistics

Honours

Player
Joinville
Campeonato Catarinense: 1987

Grêmio
Campeonato Gaúcho: 1993

Juventude
Campeonato Brasileiro Série B: 1994

Manager
Figueirense
Campeonato Catarinense: 2004

Sport Recife
Campeonato Pernambucano: 2006

Coritiba
Campeonato Paranaense: 2008

Vasco da Gama
Campeonato Brasileiro Série B: 2009

Santos
Campeonato Paulista: 2010, 2016
Copa do Brasil: 2010

Internacional
Recopa Sudamericana: 2011
Campeonato Gaúcho: 2012

Athletico Paranaense
Campeonato Paranaense: 2020

Flamengo
Copa do Brasil: 2022
Copa Libertadores: 2022

References

External links

Terceiro Tempo profile 
Grande Área profile 

1962 births
Living people
People from Araraquara
Brazilian footballers
Association football midfielders
Campeonato Brasileiro Série A players
Campeonato Brasileiro Série B players
Associação Ferroviária de Esportes players
Guarani FC players
Avaí FC players
Joinville Esporte Clube players
São José Esporte Clube players
Coritiba Foot Ball Club players
Sociedade Esportiva Palmeiras players
Grêmio Foot-Ball Porto Alegrense players
Esporte Clube Juventude players
Associação Esportiva Araçatuba players
Sociedade Esportiva Matonense players
Botafogo Futebol Clube (SP) players
Brazilian football managers
Campeonato Brasileiro Série A managers
Campeonato Brasileiro Série B managers
Figueirense FC managers
Fortaleza Esporte Clube managers
Criciúma Esporte Clube managers
Esporte Clube Juventude managers
Sport Club do Recife managers
Avaí FC managers
Associação Desportiva São Caetano managers
Cruzeiro Esporte Clube managers
Coritiba Foot Ball Club managers
CR Vasco da Gama managers
Santos FC managers
Clube Atlético Mineiro managers
Sport Club Internacional managers
CR Flamengo managers
Fluminense FC managers
Sociedade Esportiva Palmeiras managers
São Paulo FC managers
Club Athletico Paranaense managers
Ceará Sporting Club managers
Footballers from São Paulo (state)